Tope is a 2016 Indian Bengali-language psychological drama film directed by Buddhadeb Dasgupta and produced by Pawan Kanodia. The film is based on a same name short story of Narayan Gangopadhyay. The film premiered at the 2016 Toronto International Film Festival and was released on 5 May 2017 under the banner of Ava Film Productions Pvt. Ltd.

Plot
The plot revolves around three parallel stories in the style of magic realism. There is an eccentric King of rural India who can go to any extent to fulfill his dreadful wishes. Munni, a teenage girl and tightrope walker, lives with her mother. Goja, the postman who lives in jungle and suffers from meaninglessness of life.

Cast
 Ananya Chatterjee as Rekha
 Paoli Dam as Munni's mother
 Sudipto Chatterjee as King
 Kajol Kumari as Munni
 Chandan Roy Sanyal as Goja
 Krishnendu Adhikari
 Eshika Dey

References

External links
 

2016 films
Films based on short fiction
2010s psychological drama films
Indian psychological drama films
Films based on works by Narayan Gangopadhyay
Bengali-language Indian films
2010s Bengali-language films
Films directed by Buddhadeb Dasgupta